George Benjamin Williams (born 14 April 1993) is an English professional footballer who plays as a defender for League One club Cambridge United.

Career

Worcester City
Williams began his career as an academy scholar with Milton Keynes Dons before leaving to play for Midland Football League side Loughborough University, where he was studying. He joined Worcester City in the Conference North in August 2013, and on 9 November 2014 was a member of the team that infamously defeated League One side Coventry City 2–1 in an FA Cup first round tie.

Barnsley
Williams joined Barnsley on 22 December 2014. He made his professional debut on 26 December 2014 in a 1–0 defeat to Preston North End. On 29 May 2016, Williams featured in Barnsley's 3–1 League One play-off final victory over Millwall, achieving promotion to the EFL Championship. However, on 15 June 2016, Williams was released by the club.

Milton Keynes Dons
On 28 June 2016, Williams returned to Milton Keynes Dons on a two-year deal having previously played for the club's academy side. He made his debut for the club on 6 August 2016 away to Shrewsbury Town, coming on as a 90th-minute substitute, and on 18 October 2016 scored his first goal for the club with a 23rd-minute header in a 3–3 home draw with Bristol Rovers. At the end of his first season back at the club, Williams was awarded both the club's 2016–17 Player of the Year and Players' Player of the Year awards, and in July 2017 signed a new long-term deal keeping him at the club until June 2020.

Bristol Rovers
On 21 January 2021 with just six months remaining on his contract, Williams joined Bristol Rovers for an undisclosed fee. He made his debut that weekend in a 2–0 away defeat to Oxford United, coming off of the bench to replace Abu Ogogo in the 67' minute.

Cambridge United
On 25 June 2021, Williams joined League One side Cambridge United on a free transfer, returning to the division following Bristol Rovers' relegation. He made his Cambridge debut against Oxford United in a 1-1 draw.

Career statistics

Honours
Barnsley
Football League Trophy: 2015–16
Football League One play-offs: 2016

Milton Keynes Dons
EFL League Two third-place promotion: 2018–19

Individual
Milton Keynes Dons Player of the Year: 2016–17
Milton Keynes Dons Players' Player of the Year: 2016–17

References

External links
 
 

1993 births
Living people
English footballers
Footballers from Hillingdon
Barnsley F.C. players
English Football League players
National League (English football) players
Milton Keynes Dons F.C. players
Loughborough University F.C. players
Worcester City F.C. players
Bristol Rovers F.C. players
Cambridge United F.C. players
Association football defenders
Universiade silver medalists for Great Britain
Universiade medalists in football
Alumni of Loughborough University